is a Japanese professional footballer who plays as a forward for Montedio Yamagata.

Career
Yudai Konishi joined Gamba Osaka in 2016. On 1 May, he debuted in J3 League (v Blaublitz Akita).

Career statistics
Last updated 26 July 2022.

Reserves performance

References

External links
Profile at Tokushima Vortis

1998 births
Living people
Association football people from Tokushima Prefecture
Japanese footballers
J1 League players
J2 League players
J3 League players
Tokushima Vortis players
Gamba Osaka U-23 players
Association football forwards